Deh Huleh, also known as Huleh, may refer to:
 Deh Huleh-ye Olya
 Deh Huleh-ye Sofla